Iga Baumgart-Witan (born 11 April 1989) is a Polish sprinter specialising in the 400 metres. She won several medals at major championships as part of Polish 4 × 400 metres relays, including a gold in the mixed relay and a silver in the women's relay at the 2020 Tokyo Olympics.

Baumgart-Witan represented Poland in relays at the 2012 London and 2016 Rio Olympics as well as at five World Championships. She won three Polish national titles.

Competition record

Personal bests
 200 metres – 23.77 (+2.0 m/s, Gdańsk 2012)
 200 metres indoor – 24.48 (Spała 2022)
 400 metres – 51.02 (Doha 2019)
 400 metres indoor – 51.91 (Toruń 2019)
Relays
 4 × 400 metres relay – 3:20.53 (Tokyo 2021)

References

External links

Sportspeople from Bydgoszcz
Polish female sprinters
1989 births
Living people
Olympic athletes of Poland
Athletes (track and field) at the 2012 Summer Olympics
Athletes (track and field) at the 2016 Summer Olympics
World Athletics Championships athletes for Poland
World Athletics Championships medalists
Universiade medalists in athletics (track and field)
Universiade gold medalists for Poland
Medalists at the 2017 Summer Universiade
European Athletics Indoor Championships winners
Athletes (track and field) at the 2020 Summer Olympics
Medalists at the 2020 Summer Olympics
Olympic gold medalists in athletics (track and field)
Olympic silver medalists in athletics (track and field)
Olympic gold medalists for Poland
Olympic silver medalists for Poland
World Athletics Indoor Championships medalists
21st-century Polish women
European Athletics Championships winners